Mark Webber (born 18 April 1964) is a British political scientist and  international relations specialist whose research interests include the international politics of the former Soviet Union, contemporary Russian foreign policy, foreign policy analysis (FPA), politics of NATO and European Union enlargement, security studies, and comparative international organisations. He is a professor of International Politics at the University of Birmingham, where between 2011 and July 2019 he was the Head of the School of Government and Society. He was also the Head of the Department of Politics, History and International Relations at Loughborough University.

Webber has been a Trustee of the British International Studies Association (BISA) since 2014 and was the Chair of Board of Trustees of the BISA 2019 to 2020. He is a member of the Royal Institute of International Affairs and sits on the editorial board of European Security.

From September 2022 to January 2023 he was Senior Eisenhower Defence Fellow at the NATO Defence College in Rome.

External links
Mark Webber's research portal

References 

Living people
1964 births
British political scientists
Chatham House people
Academics of the University of Birmingham
Academics of Loughborough University
NATO Defense College
Members of British International Studies Association